The Labour Party of Malaya (abbrev. LPM) was a political party in Malaya that was active between 1952 and 1969. It was originally formed as a confederation of state based labour parties known as the Pan-Malayan Labour Party (PMLP).

History

Origins
The LPM's roots lay in the state labour parties that were established after the British government announced plans to organise local elections in 1950. In 1952, representatives from the state parties, 21 trade unions and the Malay left-leaning organisation SABERKAS (or Syarikat Berkerjasama Am Saiburi, not to be confused with the present day SABERKAS in Sarawak) met in Kuala Lumpur and decided to form the PMLP. This organisation initially took an anti-communist stand but was not overtly anti-colonial.

The party joined the Socialist International as a member.

The party chairman Lee Moke Sang was forced to resign as public servants were barred from political office. D.S. Ramanathan became the new chairman. With the rise of more radical socialist leadership, the positions gradually took a more anti-colonial form and in June 1954, the organisation was renamed the LPM.

Development
With a radical agenda as its platform, the LPM was routed in the Federal legislative elections of 1955 and failed to gain any seats. The LPM, however, managed to capture the City Council of Georgetown in Penang in the 1956 local elections with a majority of eight seats.

According to the party's own accounts it had more or less the same number of Malay and Chinese members, but very few Indians or people from other communities. The party identified itself as a non-communal party. It considered that the Alliance government represented capitalist and feudal groups.

The party had a youth wing called the Socialist Youth League of Malaya.

Socialist Front

Persecution

Radicalisation

Demise

Platform

Pre-Independence
The LPM's founding constitution demanded immediate self-government for Malaya, liberal citizenship laws, the Malayanization of the civil service, a planned economy, greater democratic justice and agrarian reform. The LPM also proposed for the abolishment of special privileges for any ethnic group, federal nationality to supersede state nationality, the use of Malay as the national language and English as a second language, the merger of Singapore with the Federation of Malaya, the limiting the powers of the Malay rulers, an elected presidency, and a secular state.

Post-Independence
In view of the changed circumstances after the independence of Malaya in 1957, the LPM amended its constitution in 1959 to strive for the establishment of a united democratic socialist state of Malaya and to secure for the workers who work by hand or by brain the full fruits of their industry and the most equitable distribution thereof that may be possible, upon the basis of the common ownership of the means of production, distribution and exchange, and the best obtainable system of popular administration and control of each industry or service (the latter part essentially mirroring the then Clause IV of the British Labour Party's constitution).

General elections result

State election result

References

Further reading

Penang Story: Facing Up to Storm Clouds : The Labour Party of Malaya, Penang Division, 1963 – 1969

Defunct political parties in Malaysia
1952 establishments in Malaya
1969 disestablishments in Malaysia
Political parties established in 1952
Political parties disestablished in 1969
Socialist parties in Malaysia